Back in Crime is a 2013 French crime film directed by Germinal Alvarez. It competed in the main competition section of the 35th Moscow International Film Festival.

Plot
A murder victim is found near a river by Hélène Batistelli (Mélanie Thierry), a psychiatrist.  Richard Kemp (Jean-Hugues Anglade), a French Police Captain, investigates the murder, and discovers it is similar to those in a serial-killer case he worked on in the beginning of his career. Kemp is attacked by an unknown assailant, thrown into the river, returns to land, and finds he is twenty years (1989) in the past, just before the murders begin. Kemp attempts to prevent the murders but becomes the main suspect only to find help from a younger Hélène.

Cast
 Jean-Hugues Anglade as Richard Kemp
 Mélanie Thierry as Hélène Batistelli
 Philippe Berodot as Verbeck
 Jean-Henri Compère as Simon Rouannec
 Pierre Moure as Xavier
 Loïc Rojouan as Marseglia
 Frédéric Saurel as Pierrot (as Fred Saurel)
 Nicolas Villemagne as Perce-Oreille
 Adrien Cauchetier as François
 Flor Lurienne as Hôtesse aquarium
 Elsa Galles as Jeanne

Production
The film was shot in Bordeaux, particularly in the city's Mériadeck district. Filming also took place at the port of La Rochelle and in an abandoned hospital in Rochefort, Charente-Maritime. La Rochelle's La Pallice submarine base and the Île de Ré bridge can be seen in the film.

See also
 List of films featuring time loops

References

External links
 

2013 films
2013 crime films
2010s French-language films
French crime films
Films about time travel
Time loop films
2010s French films
Films shot in Bordeaux
Films shot in Charente-Maritime